The Right Reverend David Shoji Tani (谷昌二) is the bishop of the Anglican Diocese of Okinawa in the Anglican Church in Japan. He was consecrated to the episcopate on April 25, 1998.

External links
Diocesan website 

20th-century Anglican bishops in Asia
21st-century Anglican bishops in Asia
Japanese Anglican bishops
Living people
Year of birth missing (living people)
Place of birth missing (living people)
Anglican bishops of Okinawa